Flyriella is a genus of perennial flowering plants in the family Asteraceae, and the species are commonly called brickellbush. They are native to Texas and Mexico.

Species
Species:
 Flyriella chrysostyla (B.L. Rob.) R.M. King & H. Rob. - (Eupatorium chrysostylum B.L. Rob.) - Chihuahua
 Flyriella harrimanii R.M. King & H. Rob. - Tamaulipas
 Flyriella leonensis (B.L. Rob.) R.M. King & H. Rob. - (Eupatorium leonense B.L. Rob.) -  Nuevo León
 Flyriella parryi (A. Gray) R.M. King & H. Rob. - (Eupatorium parryi A. Gray) -  Chihuahua, Coahuila, Nuevo León, Texas,
 Flyriella sphenopoda (B.L. Rob.) R.M. King & H. Rob. - (Eupatorium sphenopodum B.L. Rob.) -  Nuevo León
 Flyriella stanfordii R.M. King & H. Rob. - Nuevo León, Tamaulipas

References

Eupatorieae
Asteraceae genera
Flora of North America